"Waking Up in Vegas" is a song by American singer Katy Perry, released as the fourth and final single from her second studio album, One of the Boys (2008). Perry wrote the song with Desmond Child and Andreas Carlsson, and Greg Wells produced it, who is also credited for playing all the instruments on the song. It was officially released to US radio stations on April 21, 2009. "Waking Up in Vegas" is a pop rock track about an underage couple getting drunk and blowing their money in Las Vegas, paying homage to the phrase "what happens in Vegas, stays in Vegas."

The song reached the top ten in eight countries, including the United States, where it peaked at number nine and became Perry's third top ten single. It also reached number one on the Mainstream Top 40 subchart and on Hungarian radio. The music video was directed by Joseph Kahn and it features Perry and actor Joel David Moore in Vegas partying and gambling. Perry performed the track during her Hello Katy Tour and California Dreams Tour, and an acoustic snippet was sung during the Las Vegas show of Witness: The Tour. The song is a playable track in the 2015 video game Guitar Hero Live and was added to Rock Band 4 in March 2022 as DLC. The song was used to promote Perry's concert residency at Resorts World Las Vegas, which began in December 2021.

Background and release
According to A&R Chris Anokute, "Waking Up in Vegas" played a significant role in initiating Perry's pivotal move to Capitol Records. Having been recorded while still under contract with Columbia Records for an album that was then shelved, Anokute later heard the track on a three-song demo and tried to convince his employers at Capitol to sign Perry, claiming it was a number-one single and its singer a star talent.  In an interview with HitQuarters, one of the songwriters of the song, Andreas Carlsson, claimed that he worked together with Perry and Desmond Child to write "Waking Up in Vegas". Carlsson remarked that they "really wanted to tell the story that described that moment when everybody's checking out on Vegas after they've had their fun. And Katy is the perfect artist to tell such a story – she has humour, and she knows how to deliver it." Carlsson also said that two of the first aspects of the song to be composed were the main guitar riff – which he already had pre-prepared – and the phrase "put your money where your mouth is," which they were very keen to use and which for a time was almost used as the song's title.

In an interview for Pop Eater, Perry revealed the inspiration behind the track:

What inspired it [was] this boy I was dating at the time. I was 21. We went to Vegas on a whim and we decided to get fake married. We took all the pictures with the minister, with the fake cake, in the fake chapel and got a fake marriage certificate. We went and bought a wedding dress and a suit at a thrift store, and scanned the pictures and the certificate to my family members, my manager at the time [and] totally freaked the shit out of them. It was the most hilarious, stupid prank I've ever pulled. I still have the wedding dress and the certificate.

"Waking Up in Vegas" was eventually picked as the album's fourth and final single, being sent to US radio stations on April 21, 2009. On the single's artwork, Perry is seen with two dice behind her, giving more emphasis to the song's lyrical content of being in Vegas. A digital extended play containing the radio edit, Calvin Harris remix, Jason Nevins remixes and Manhattan Clique remixes was released on June 5, 2009. Later in June, the CD single featuring the radio edit version of the song and the Calvin Harris remix edit was released in United Kingdom and Germany.

Composition and lyrics
"Waking Up in Vegas" was produced by Greg Wells, who is also responsible for all instruments in the track, as well as for recording the track at the Rocket Carousel Studio, in Los Angeles, California. According to the sheet music published at Musicnotes.com, by Alfred Music Publishing, the song is written in the key of F major, and moves at a tempo of 126 beats per minute. Perry's vocals span from the low note of A3 to the high note of C5. Musically, the song has been described as a pop rock song. Lyrically, according to Plugged In, "Waking Up in Vegas" talks about an underage couple get[ting] drunk and blow[ing] their money before [literally] 'waking up in Vegas'." Perry added that the song is not about apologizing, "[It's] basically a song about getting into trouble with your best friend or your boyfriend or your girlfriend – or whoever you're with – and not having any 'I'm sorry for what I did'."

Reception
Following the disappointing chart position of her previous single "Thinking of You", "Waking Up In Vegas" saw Perry return to the top ten as it peaked at number nine on the Billboard Hot 100, becoming her third top-ten single.

"Waking Up In Vegas" debuted on the UK Singles Chart at number 107, following her performance on Ant & Dec's Saturday Night Takeaway, and peaked at number 19.

"Waking Up in Vegas" also went on to become Perry's second number one hit on Mainstream Top 40, matching the airplay success of  "Hot n Cold". In Canada, the song peaked at number two. On the Irish Singles Chart, it peaked at number eight. Ultimately, the song's success was considered a rebound for Perry after "Thinking of You" failed to ignite the charts. The single also helped One of the Boys return to the top 50 of the Billboard 200 albums chart. "Waking Up in Vegas" was the 33rd most purchased song on iTunes in the US during 2009. As of January 2015, the song has sold 2.3 million copies in the U.S. The song also peaked at number nine in New Zealand and is certified Gold.

Billboard gave the song a positive review, stating it's Perry's "most radio-friendly song yet." Digital Spy gave "Waking Up in Vegas" 3/5 stars, calling the song "a giddy pop-rock romp featuring an ace sing-along chorus."

Music video

The music video was directed by Joseph Kahn, and was shot in Las Vegas, Nevada, on March 26, 2009. It was released on April 28, 2009, on the Australian, UK, and U.S. iTunes Store.

The video begins with Perry holding hands with her love interest, played by Joel David Moore. They are in a laundromat, standing in front of a slot machine. It is the morning after the night before, setting the theme of the song's lyric, "That's what you get for waking up in Vegas". Moore drops one coin into the slot machine and pulls the handle. Three "blazing 7" symbols land on the payline, and the machine delivers a jackpot in quarters. Moore and Perry look at each other in astonishment.

The next scene shows them winning at roulette the night before. They then head to the hotel room, where they kick out Penn and Teller. Subsequent scenes show the couple playing various casino games and parlaying their winnings into millions, defeating poker legend Daniel Negreanu, and being welcomed into the Palms Hotel by owners Gavin and George J. Maloof Jr.

As the winning streak continues, Perry and Moore enjoy a lavish lifestyle, racing through the streets of Las Vegas in his-and-hers Lamborghini Murciélagos. At the height of the streak, they are dressed in show costumes while riding in chariots down Fremont Street, accompanied by a fire-breather and an elephant. They end by feasting at a Roman-style banquet, with visuals that recall the Last Supper.

Perry and Moore kiss in a money booth. After the kiss, the couple's luck changes. They begin to argue. They lose all their winnings except a single quarter and are ejected from their hotel suite (which Penn and Teller reclaim, even performing a card trick before slamming the door on the couple). Perry steals food from a room service tray.

The video ends in the laundromat where it began. The couple is broke; Moore places their single remaining coin in the slot machine and pulls the handle. Three "blazing 7" symbols land on the payline, and the machine delivers a jackpot in quarters. Moore and Perry look at each other in astonishment as the screen goes black.

Live performances

Perry performed "Waking Up in Vegas" on Later... with Jools Holland in September 2008. She was also a guest on Ant & Dec's Saturday Night Takeaway in March 2009 where she performed "Waking Up in Vegas" instead of her then-current single, "Thinking of You", which had been released that month. She performed on a Las Vegas-themed stage with her backing band dressed as Elvis Presley. The single was released to Australian radio on March 23, where it became the fourth most added song in its release week. Perry performed the song on American Idol on May 13, 2009. During the performance, she was dressed in an Elvis-themed outfit and a cape emblazoned with Adam Lambert's name on it.

Perry performed the song on July 24, 2009, on NBC's Today show in New York's Rockefeller Plaza. The song was a part of the Perry's set list on Warped Tour and her opening act for No Doubt's Summer Tour 2009. It was the main set closer for the Hello Katy Tour and ending the first segment of California Dreams Tour, which Perry danced with Elvis impersonators and Vegas showgirls, before chasing a slot-machine offstage. During the Vegas stop of Witness: The Tour, Perry sang an acoustic snippet of the song for fans, before performing "Thinking of You".

Track listing

 Digital extended play
 "Waking Up in Vegas" (Radio Edit) – 3:24
 "Waking Up in Vegas" (Calvin Harris Extended Remix) – 3:44
 "Waking Up in Vegas" (Jason Nevins Electrotec Club Remix) – 6:41
 "Waking Up in Vegas" (Jason Nevins Electrotec Dub) – 6:02
 "Waking Up in Vegas" (Manhattan Clique Bellagio Remix) – 6:18
 "Waking Up in Vegas" (Manhattan Clique Luxor Dub) – 6:06

 German and UK CD Single
 "Waking Up in Vegas" (Radio Edit) – 3:22
 "Waking Up in Vegas" (Calvin Harris Radio Edit) – 3:43

Remixes

 Calvin Harris Mixes
 "Waking Up in Vegas" (Calvin Harris Extended Mix) – 5:41
 "Waking Up in Vegas" (Calvin Harris Radio Edit) – 3:43
 Jason Nevins Mixes
 "Waking Up in Vegas" (Jason Nevins Electrotec Club Mix) – 6:40
 "Waking Up in Vegas" (Jason Nevins Electrotec Dub) – 6:04
 "Waking Up In Vegas" (Jason Nevins Electrotec Edit) – 3:23

 Manhattan Clique Mixes
 "Waking Up in Vegas" (Manhattan Clique Bellagio Remix) – 6:22
 "Waking Up in Vegas" (Manhattan Clique Luxor Dub) – 6:08
 "Waking Up In Vegas" (Manhattan Clique Radio Edit) – 3:50

Credits and personnel
Credits adapted from CD single liner notes and Tidal.

Publishing and recording locations
 Published by When I'm Rich You'll Be My Bitch/Desmando Music/Andreas Carlsson Publishing AR/WB Music Corp
 Recorded at Rocket Carousel Studio, Los Angeles, California
 Mixed at MixStar Studios, Virginia Beach, Virginia
 Mastered at Bornie Grundman Mastering, Hollywood, California

Personnel

 Katy Perry – vocals, songwriting , production
 Desmond Child – songwriting
 Andreas Carlsson – songwriting
 Greg Wells – production, recording assistant
 Serban Ghenea – mixing
 John Hanes – mixing engineering
 Joe Zook – mixing engineering
 Tim Roberts – mixing engineering assistant
 Brian "Big Bass" Gardner – mastering

Charts and certifications

Weekly charts

Year-end charts

Certifications

Release history

References

2009 singles
Katy Perry songs
Music videos directed by Joseph Kahn
American pop rock songs
Songs written by Desmond Child
Songs written by Katy Perry
Songs written by Andreas Carlsson
Songs about Las Vegas
Song recordings produced by Greg Wells
2009 songs
Capitol Records singles
American power pop songs